Aloeides taikosama, the dusky copper, is a butterfly of the family Lycaenidae. It is found in South Africa, Botswana, Lesotho, Mozambique and Zimbabwe. In South Africa it is found from the eastern Western Cape to the Eastern Cape, the Free State, northern KwaZulu-Natal, Gauteng, Mpumalanga, Limpopo, North West and the eastern Northern Cape.

The wingspan is 22–27 mm for males and 27–33 mm for females. Adults are on wing from August to April, with peaks in November and March. There are multiple generations per year.

References

Butterflies described in 1857
Aloeides